Line 24 may refer to:
Line 24 (Guangzhou Metro)
Line 24 (São Paulo Metro)
Line 24 (Shanghai Metro)
S24 (ZVV), a line on the Zürich S-Bahn
Yizhuang line of Beijing Subway, also known as Line 24